Our Lady of the Sacred Heart Church is a Roman Catholic church in Randwick, Sydney, New South Wales, Australia. It is heritage-listed.

History and description
The church is situated in Avoca Street, Randwick, adjacent to the commercial centre of the area. It was designed by Sheerin and Hennessy in a Gothic Revival style and built in 1888. It consists predominantly of brick with sandstone trimmings, with a spire on its southern side. Inside, there is a trussed timber roof and a stained-glass window behind the altar. A Gothic-style octagonal chapel and shrine are located near the altar.

The church is listed on the local government heritage register. The sandstone building next door, known as Ventnor, is owned and used by the church. It was built in 1870 and was the home of George Kiss, Mayor of Randwick. It also is listed on the local government heritage register.

Work 
Our Lady of the Sacred Heart Parish, Randwick,  St. Margaret Mary’s Parish, Randwick North, are Catholic parishes under the care of the Missionaries of the Sacred Heart and share a common heritage and administration in the Roman Catholic Archdiocese of Sydney. The parishes are located within a busy urban centre and include two regional Catholic high schools, two parish primary schools, a large public teaching hospital complex, a major university and aged care facilities.

Gallery

See also 

Roman Catholicism in Australia

References

External links 

 Official site

Randwick
Randwick, New South Wales
Roman Catholic churches completed in 1888
1888 establishments in Australia
Gothic Revival architecture in Sydney
Randwick
Gothic Revival church buildings in Australia
19th-century Roman Catholic church buildings in Australia